Calpain-1 catalytic subunit (CANP 1) is a protein that in humans is encoded by the CAPN1 gene.

Function 

The calpains, calcium-activated neutral proteases, are nonlysosomal, intracellular cysteine proteases. The mammalian calpains include ubiquitous, stomach-specific, and muscle-specific proteins. The ubiquitous enzymes consist of heterodimers with distinct large, catalytic subunits associated with a common small, regulatory subunit. This gene encodes the large subunit of the ubiquitous enzyme, calpain 1.

Interactions 

CAPN1 has been shown to interact with PSEN2.

References

Further reading

External links 
 The MEROPS online database for peptidases and their inhibitors: C02.001
 

EF-hand-containing proteins